Kiira Yrjänen (born 2 January 2002) is a Finnish ice hockey player and member of the Finnish national team, currently signed with HV71 Dam of the Swedish Women's Hockey League (SDHL). She was officially named to the Finnish roster for the 2020 IIHF Women's World Championship on 4 March 2020, before the tournament was cancelled on 7 March 2020 due to public health concerns related to the COVID-19 pandemic.

Playing career
The 2020 World Championship would have been Yrjänen's debut with the Finnish women's national team at an IIHF-organized international tournament, though she has previously represented Finland with the women's national U18 team at the IIHF World Women's U18 Championships in 2017, 2018, and 2020, and with the bronze medal team in 2019.

Yrjänen's first goal with the Finnish women's national team was scored on 6 February 2020 in a match against the Swiss national team at the Finals Tournament of the 2019–20 Women's Euro Hockey Tour.

References

External links 
 

2002 births
Living people
Finnish expatriate ice hockey players in Sweden
Finnish women's ice hockey forwards
HV71 Dam players
Kiekko-Espoo Naiset players
People from Riihimäki
Sportspeople from Kanta-Häme
Team Kuortane players